Dadar may also refer to:
 Dadar, a densely populated locality in Mumbai
 Dadar railway station, a railway station in Dadar, Mumbai
 Dadar, Raigad district,  a census town situated in Maharashtra, India
 Dadar (ritual tool), an arrow like tool, associated with Saraha